In Greek mythology, Anaideia (Ancient Greek: Ἀναιδείας means 'shamelessness') was the goddess or spirit of ruthlessness, shamelessness and unforgiveness. She was the companion of Hybris. Her opposite partner was Eleos, the goddess of mercy.

Note

References

 Pausanias, Description of Greece with an English Translation by W.H.S. Jones, Litt.D., and H.A. Ormerod, M.A., in 4 Volumes. Cambridge, MA, Harvard University Press; London, William Heinemann Ltd. 1918. . Online version at the Perseus Digital Library
 Pausanias, Graeciae Descriptio. 3 vols. Leipzig, Teubner. 1903.  Greek text available at the Perseus Digital Library.  

Greek goddesses
Personifications in Greek mythology